Collection: The Shrapnel Years is a compilation album by guitarist Greg Howe, released on October 10, 2006, through Shrapnel Records.

Track listing

Personnel
Greg Howe – guitar, guitar synthesizer, keyboard (except tracks 9, 11), drums (track 4), bass (tracks 4, 9), engineering, production
Vitalij Kuprij – keyboard (track 9)
David Cook – keyboard (track 11)
Atma Anur – drums (tracks 1, 8)
Kevin Soffera – drums (tracks 2, 3, 10), udu
Jon Doman – drums (tracks 5, 6, 9)
Dennis Chambers – drums (track 11)
Billy Sheehan – bass (track 1)
Alsamad Caldwell – bass (track 2)
Vern Parsons – bass (track 3), engineering
Andy Ramirez – bass (tracks 5, 6)
Kevin Vecchione – bass (tracks 7, 8)
Dale Fischer – bass (track 10)
Victor Wooten – bass (track 11)
Steve Fontano – engineering
Mark Gifford – engineering
Mark Rafferty – engineering
Mike Varney – production

References

External links
In Review: Greg Howe "Collection: The Shrapnel Years" at Guitar Nine Records

Greg Howe albums
2006 greatest hits albums
Shrapnel Records albums
Albums produced by Mike Varney